Lyon Olympique Universitaire or LOU is a French rugby union team based in Lyon that currently competes in the Top 14, the highest level of the country's professional league system, having been most recently promoted for the 2016–17 season after winning the 2015–16 title of the second-level Pro D2. The club has bounced between the top two levels in recent years, having also been promoted in 2011 and 2014 and relegated in 2012 and 2015.

They were founded in 1896 and play in red and black. In 2011, the team left the Stade Vuillermet to the new Matmut Stadium. In 2017 the team moved to the Matmut Stadium de Gerland.

History
Le LOU, as it is traditionally known, is one of the oldest sports clubs in France and among the first outside Paris to have set up a rugby section. The club’s original name was Racing Club, the result of a merger of the Racing Club de Vaise and the Rugby Club de Lyon. It was renamed Racing et Cercles Réunis in 1902 after several other clubs joined it, then a few months later Lyon Olympique. Finally, in 1910, it became Lyon Olympique Universitaire. The red and black were adopted in 1902.

The club developed several sections (it now has 13), one of the most successful being the rugby union section, which is now known as LOU Rugby. The rugby club took part in three successive French championship finals (1931–33), losing the first one to Toulon (3-6) but winning the next two against Narbonne (9-3 and 10-3). It then played in lower amateur leagues until it was promoted back to the second professional division (Pro D2). In 2006-07, it had the second biggest budget of the championship and its ambition was to rejoin the Top 14 in the next two years, under the leadership of their coach Christian Lanta, who formerly led Racing Club de France, Italian club Treviso and Agen. However, they would not succeed in their promotion quest until 2011. Since then, they have been a proverbial "yo-yo team", having been either relegated or promoted four times in the six seasons since their 2011 promotion.

Honours
 Challenge Cup:
 Champions: 2022
 Champion de France:
 Champions: 1932, 1933
 Runners-up: 1931
 Rugby Pro D2:
 Champions: 2011, 2014, 2016
 Challenge Yves du Manoir:
 Champions: 1933
 Fédérale 1:
 Champions: 2002
 Deuxième Division:
 Champions: 1989, 1992
Juniors: 2012
Cadets: 1984,2017

Finals results

French championship

Challenge Yves du Manoir

European Challenge Cup Finals

Current standings

Current squad

The Lyon squad for the 2022–23 season is:

Espoirs squad

The Lyon OU Espoirs squad is:

See also
 List of rugby union clubs in France
 Rugby union in France

References

External links
  Lyon OU Official website
 LOU Omnisports Sportsclub

French rugby union clubs
Rugby clubs established in 1896
Sport in Lyon